2001 World Championships may refer to:

 Alpine skiing: Alpine World Ski Championships 2001
 Aquatics: 2001 World Aquatics Championships
 Athletics:
 2001 World Championships in Athletics
 2001 IAAF World Indoor Championships
Cross-country running: 2001 IAAF World Cross Country Championships
Road running: 2001 IAAF World Half Marathon Championships
 Badminton: 2001 IBF World Championships
 Bandy: Bandy World Championship 2001
 Biathlon: Biathlon World Championships 2001
 Boxing: 2001 World Amateur Boxing Championships
 Chess: FIDE World Chess Championship 2001
 Curling:
 2001 World Men's Curling Championship
 2001 World Women's Curling Championship
 Darts: 2001 BDO World Darts Championship
 Darts: 2001 PDC World Darts Championship
 Figure skating: 2001 World Figure Skating Championships
 Ice hockey: 2001 Men's World Ice Hockey Championships
 Ice hockey: 2001 Women's World Ice Hockey Championships
 Nordic skiing: FIS Nordic World Ski Championships 2001
 Speed skating:
Allround: 2001 World Allround Speed Skating Championships
Sprint: 2001 World Sprint Speed Skating Championships
Single distances: 2001 World Single Distance Speed Skating Championships

See also
 2001 World Cup (disambiguation)
 2001 Continental Championships (disambiguation)
 2001 World Junior Championships (disambiguation)